The UK Dance Singles Chart is a weekly music chart compiled in the United Kingdom by the Official Charts Company (OCC) from sales of songs in the dance music genre (house, drum and bass, dubstep, etc.) in record stores and digital downloads. The dates listed in the menus below through 4 July 2015 represent the Saturday after the Sunday the chart was announced, as per the way the dates are given in chart publications such as the ones produced by Billboard, Guinness, and Virgin. As of 9 July 2015, the chart week runs from Friday to Thursday with the chart-date given as the following Thursday.

This is a list of the songs which were number one on the UK Dance Singles Chart during 2015.

Chart history

 – the single was simultaneously number-one on the singles chart.

Number-one artists

See also

List of number-one singles of 2015 (UK)
List of UK Dance Chart number-one albums of 2015
List of UK Indie Chart number-one singles of 2015
List of UK R&B Chart number-one singles of 2015
List of UK Rock & Metal Singles Chart number ones of 2015

References

External links
Dance Singles Top 40 at the Official Charts Company
UK Top 40 Dance Singles at BBC Radio 1

2015 in British music
United Kingdom Dance Singles
2015